CGCC may refer to:
Chandler-Gilbert Community College
China General Chamber of Commerce-U.S.A.
Coastal Georgia Community College
Columbia Gorge Community College
Columbia-Greene Community College
Confucius Genealogy Compilation Committee
Canwest Global Communications Corporation